Susan Forrest is an Australian genomics expert and Director/CEO of the Australian Genome Research Facility (AGRF).

Career

Forrest graduated with first class honours in Biochemistry and Genetics from Melbourne University in Australia. She received a scholarship in Medicine to do her doctorate at Oxford University with Professor Kay Davies. She researched on the genetic basis of Duchenne muscular dystrophy.

She returned to Australia and joined the Murdoch Childrens Research Institute (MCRI) in Melbourne. She continued research in genetics and headed the DNA Diagnostic Laboratory at MCRI. In 2001, she was appointed as scientific director at AGRF.

Education 
 BSc (honours) Biochemistry, Genetics at University of Melbourne (1978-1981)
 DPhil Oxford University (1984-1988)
 B.Bus Administration, RMIT (1990-1995)

References

External links 
 Australian Genome Research Facility Ltd
Dr. Susan Forrest speech, Australian Government Department of Industry, Inspiring Australia Program

Australian women scientists
Australian geneticists
Living people
Year of birth missing (living people)